Jacob Kwame Berkeley-Agyepong (born 29 July 1997) is a footballer who plays as an attacking midfielder for National League North club Gloucester City. Born in England, he plays for the Grenada national team.

Club career
Berkeley-Agyepong joined youth academy of Crystal Palace at the age of eight. He was released by the club after the end of 2017–18 season. He joined Aldershot Town in 2018.

On 28 December 2019, Dartford announced the signing of Berkeley-Agyepong on a short-term loan deal.

After a successful spell at Dartford, Berkeley-Agyepong rejoined Aldershot Town on 11 August 2021.

International career
Born in England, Berkeley-Agyepong is of Grenadian and Ghanaian descent. On 1 July 2021, he was named in Grenada's 23-man squad for 2021 CONCACAF Gold Cup. He made his international debut on 13 July in a 4–0 group match defeat against Honduras.

Career statistics

Club

International

Scores and results list Grenada's goal tally first, score column indicates score after each Berkeley-Agyepong goal.

References

External links
 

1997 births
Living people
Footballers from Croydon
Grenadian footballers
Grenada international footballers
English footballers
Grenadian people of Ghanaian descent
English sportspeople of Grenadian descent
English sportspeople of Ghanaian descent
Association football midfielders
Black British sportsmen
Aldershot Town F.C. players
Dartford F.C. players
National League (English football) players
2021 CONCACAF Gold Cup players